Borota is a village and municipality (Hungarian: község) in Bács-Kiskun county, located in the Southern Great Plain region of Hungary.

Geography 

History 
Borota was mentioned in 1325 as Boroth and it was property of the archbishop of Kalocsa. Since the village had been devastated by the Mongol invasion of 1241–42, the archbishop sold the village to Imre Becsey who brought new settlers to Borota. In the 16th century Borota fell under Ottoman occupation and was mentioned several times in Turkish records. In 1658 Palatine Ferenc Wesselényi donated the village to Baron Pál Serényi. In 1740 Borota was in the hands of the Princes Grassalkovich. However, they divided the estate into plots and sold it to the Cseszneky family. Since 1750 Borota belonged to Rém village, but its southern part known as Szentkáta remained the property of the Counts Cseszneky de Milvány until the 20th century. In the second half of the 19th century Borota was an independent village for a short while, then administered again by Rém. In 1911 eventually regained its administrative independence.

Demographics 
In the 2011 census, the municipality had a population of 1,443 individuals, with 82.7% of the population reporting to be Hungarian, 1.2% German, 0.4% Roma, 0.4% Romanian and 17.2% declining to answer. The majority of the population were adherents of Roman Catholicism (62%), with 28.7% declining to answer and 6.4% following no religion.

References

Populated places in Bács-Kiskun County